Eight Legged Freaks (originally titled Arach Attack, under which it was released in some parts of Europe and other countries around the world) is a 2002 monster comedy horror film directed by Ellory Elkayem and starring David Arquette, Kari Wuhrer, Scott Terra, Doug E. Doug, and Scarlett Johansson. The plot follows spiders that are exposed to mutagenic toxic waste, causing them to grow to colossal sizes and attack a small American mining town.

Plot

On a highway outside of the quiet mining town of Prosperity, Arizona, a truck driver carrying a load of chemicals swerves to avoid a rabbit, causing a barrel of toxic waste to land in a pond. Crickets that feed from the pond are collected by an exotic spider farmer named Joshua Taft.

One week later, he shows Mike Parker, a local boy, his collection, including an enormous female orb-weaver spider from Brazil named Consuela. After Mike leaves, Joshua is bitten by an escaped tarantula and accidentally knocks down the spider cages. He alongside his pet parrot are killed by the spiders. After devouring him, the spiders grow to even larger proportions due to the toxins of the crickets Joshua feeds them.

Another week, Chris McCormick, whose father owned the mines before he died 10 years ago, shows up and stands against Wade, the mayor of Prosperity, about his proposition to sell the mine, as he believes that his father had discovered a gold vein in the mine. Chris also sparks a romance with Sam Parker, the town sheriff and Mike's mother.

Meanwhile, Wade is holding a town meeting in the mall about whether they should sell the mines and relocate. Wade later on insults Chris's father for being delusional for thinking that gold is in the mine, only to be punched by Chris. Mike sneaks out on foot and finds Joshua and the spiders missing, the farm covered in webbing, and the dead body of Joshua. Although he sees an enormous spider shadow in the mines and tells Chris that the spiders have grown to enormous sizes based on a giant spider leg he found at the mine entrance, Chris does not believe him.

Seeing as the entire town is connected in some way to the mines, spiders show up in many different places. Harlan Griffiths, an eccentric extraterrestrial enthusiast, is broadcasting his theory that various missing pets around town have been abducted by aliens. A farmer finds his ostriches missing, and trapdoor spiders were found to be preying on them. Sam's daughter and Mike's older sister Ashley breaks up with her boyfriend Bret, before his motorcyclist friends and he are chased by jumping spiders, with him being the only survivor, accidentally cutting off the telephone line and being stuck in the mine in the process. While traversing the mines, he finds Consuela feeding on victims who were trapped in spider webbing.

Chris finds out that his aunt Gladys and her dog are abducted by a male orb weaver in their basement. Sam is convinced Chris and Mike are delusional, but they were right all along when Sam witnesses a giant male orb weaver attempting to abduct Ashley and Chris. Sam kills the spider with a shotgun and saves them both before contacting Pete to tell him to bring all guns in the police station's possession to the mall. The group, consisting of Ashley, Chris, Sam, and Mike, escape to Harlan's trailer, knowing he has a radio station in his trailer.

As Sam broadcasts the threat over the radio, a giant tarantula, the "tank" of the horde, assaults his trailer, but they manage to escape. As the town is besieged by vicious spider hordes, many people are eaten. Sam tells everybody to evacuate to the mall and barricade themselves, while Wade flees into the mines and locks the gate before the attack, forcing the rest to defend themselves from the arachnids. Harlan and Chris climb onto the roof and ascend the radio mast and try to get a signal to call the army as they are being attacked by the spiders, but are believed to be pranksters by a 911 receiver. Harlan jumps from the roof after the tarantula breaks open the gates and lets the spiders enter the mall, and lands in some bushes, where he meets Pete.

While the townsfolk are in the basement, Bret arrives on a forklift that brings down the locked gate, and they all head through the mines straight to the front entrance, discovering the methane-filled tunnels. After freeing Wade, Chris goes to look for Gladys in the mines and finds her and the gold vein his father had claimed to have discovered. Filled with joy to realize that his father is not delusional like Wade or many people claim, this moment of celebration is cut short, and they are confronted by the gigantic Consuela. Using perfume to distract the spider and escaping on Bret's motorcycle, Chris then blows up the spiders and the mines using Gladys's smoking addiction and the high concentrations of methane gas, blowing up the mall before the police arrived. Wade is distraught at the destruction of the mall and hopes that the insurance will cover the damages.

As the story ends, Harlan concludes his radio report that the town has decided to cover up the whole incident, but let Harlan continue broadcasting the incident. Harlan states that Chris reopened the mine, informing that another story was coming by giving a toothy smile, revealing several golden teeth.

Cast

Production
Director Ellory Elkayem got the idea from his 1997 short film, Larger Than Life, which also handled a spider-fighting storyline.

The film was originally titled Arach Attack (under which it was released in some parts of Europe and other countries around the world) but the similarity to "Iraq Attack" made the title seem inappropriate so near the start of the Iraq War. The title Eight Legged Freaks is a line that Arquette ad-libbed in the movie: "Get back, you eight-legged freaks!"

The film was dedicated to the memory of several people: Lewis Arquette, father of David Arquette, who died in 2001 from heart failure, and Don Devlin and Pilar Seurat, the parents of producer Dean Devlin, who died of lung cancer in 2000 and 2001 respectively.

Filming locations
Prosperity is a fictional town in Arizona, though the film was actually shot in various locations in the state.

 The scenes inside Prosperity Mall were actually shot at Manistee Town Center, a closed mall in Glendale, Arizona. The mall was demolished a year after shooting was completed and redeveloped; its demolition was featured in the film as a consequence of the tunnel's methane gas explosion.
 The scenes in Aunt Gladys's house in the kitchen and in Gladys' basement were filmed at the Manistee Ranch in Glendale, directly adjacent to the mall itself.
 Some of the town scenes were shot in the old copper mining town of Superior, Arizona.
 The gas station scene was shot in Black Canyon City, Arizona.

Spiders used in the film
The following spiders were used in the film:

 Jumping spider
 Orb-weaver spider (Consuela (Matriarch of the Spider Army) and her fellow male Orb-weavers)
 Tarantula (Tank the Pinktoe Tarantula: Second-in-command of the Spider Army)
 Trapdoor spider
 Spitting spider
 Tiger Wolf spider

Alternate credits

Alternate beginning
The alternate beginning is an extended version in which Harlan does a broadcast promoting the mall after which a worker at the mall sees Wade having the toxic waste put in the basement.

Alternate ending
In the alternate ending after the mines are blown up, the townsfolk walk down a road to get help. They meet up with Pete and Harlan who were walking through the desert. Pete trying to convince Harlan the spiders were not aliens. Afterward, Sam and Chris kiss as the scene ends.

Release
The teaser trailer debuted in October 2001 attached to Thirteen Ghosts, Scooby-Doo and Queen of the Damned. The film was originally going to be released on March 15, but the date was moved because of the competition of Fox’s family friendly film Ice Age.

Reception

On Rotten Tomatoes the film has an approval rating of 48% based on reviews from 145 critics, with an average rating of 5.44/10. The site's consensus states: "This homage to the B-movies of the '50s has a promising first half, but runs out of ideas in the second". On Metacritic the film has a score of 53% based on reviews from 32 critics, indicating "mixed or average reviews". Audiences polled by CinemaScore gave the film a grade "B−" on scale of A to F.

Roger Ebert of the Chicago Sun-Times gave it 3 out of 4 and wrote: "Has laughs, thrills, wit and scary monsters, and is one of those goofy movies like Critters that kids itself and gets away with it."

Video game
A video game adaptation titled Eight Legged Freaks: Let the Squashing Begin was also released in 2002 for PC and Mac.

Cancelled sequel
On January 5, 2003, the movie news website Moviehole reported that Eight Legged Freaks 2 was in development, but no additional information has come forth since then.

Home Media
Eight Legged Freaks was released on VHS and on DVD in both widescreen and fullscreen edition formats in October 2002. Shout! Factory released the film on Blu-ray for the first time on July 20, 2021.

References

External links

 
 
 

2002 films
2002 comedy horror films
2002 science fiction films
2000s American films
2000s English-language films
2000s monster movies
2000s science fiction comedy films
2000s science fiction horror films
American comedy horror films
American monster movies
American natural horror films
American science fiction comedy films
American science fiction horror films
Australian comedy horror films
Australian monster movies
Australian natural horror films
Australian science fiction comedy films
Australian science fiction horror films
Centropolis Entertainment films
English-language German films
Films about spiders
Films directed by Ellory Elkayem
Films scored by John Ottman
Films set in Arizona
Films set in department stores
Films shot in Arizona
German comedy horror films
German monster movies
German science fiction comedy films
German science fiction horror films
Giant monster films
Village Roadshow Pictures films
Warner Bros. films
2000s German films